Norberto Ezequiel Vidal (born 2 August 1995) is an Argentine professional footballer who plays as a winger or forward for Liga 1 side Persita Tangerang.

Career
Vidal started his Olimpo senior career in 2011, when he was an unused substitute for a Copa Argentina win against Central Norte on 30 November. He was also an unused sub once during the 2011–12 Argentine Primera División, prior to making his professional debut in 2013–14 in a win away to San Lorenzo on 4 August 2013. Two years later, after seven appearances for Olimpo, Vidal joined fellow Argentine Primera División team Independiente on loan. He subsequently made eight appearances over two seasons, including his Independiente debut versus Nueva Chicago on 19 September 2015.

He returned to Olimpo in July 2016 but was immediately loaned out again, to Ecuadorian Serie A side Delfín. Twenty appearances followed as Delfín finished ninth overall. Vidal then made six more appearances for Olimpo to end the 2016–17 season, before departing on loan in August 2017 to play for Juventud in the Uruguayan Primera División. He scored in his twelfth and final appearance for Juventud, in a 2–5 defeat at home to Montevideo Wanderers on 3 December. Juventud ended 2017 with relegation.

Career statistics
.

References

External links

1995 births
Living people
Sportspeople from Bahía Blanca
Argentine footballers
Association football forwards
Argentine expatriate footballers
Expatriate footballers in Ecuador
Expatriate footballers in Uruguay
Expatriate footballers in Indonesia
Argentine expatriate sportspeople in Ecuador
Argentine expatriate sportspeople in Uruguay
Argentine expatriate sportspeople in Indonesia
Argentine Primera División players
Primera Nacional players
Ecuadorian Serie A players
Uruguayan Primera División players
Liga 1 (Indonesia) players
Olimpo footballers
Club Atlético Independiente footballers
Delfín S.C. footballers
Juventud de Las Piedras players
San Martín de San Juan footballers
Club Atlético Alvarado players
Independiente Rivadavia footballers
Persita Tangerang players